Jerry Lind (October 31, 1937 to October 17, 2017) in Duluth, Minnesota, also known as Baron von Lind, is an American portrait painter and pin-up artist. He is the son of Baron Johann von Lind. After he left the United States military in 1989, Lind assumed his ancestral name of "von Lind".

Early career
von Lind began his artistic career as a young apprentice in a publishing firm doing graphic art. In later years, he would work in the fields of art direction, magazine art illustration, portrait painter, pinup artist for calendars and classical painting.

Celebrity work
von Lind also worked at Paramount Studios where he painted such stars as Yul Brynner, Sophia Loren, Peter O'Toole and Clint Eastwood to name a few. In 1982, he was approached by the White House to do a painting of then President Ronald Reagan. The painting now hangs in the Reagan Museum in Simi Valley, California.

Museums
Museums that display his works include the Proctor Historical Society, and the 15th Air Force Museum in Riverside, California. His painting titled 'Mission 207' was dedicated on May 14, 2004 at March Air Force Base and is now permanently displayed as part of the museum's history honoring the men and aircraft of the World War II era.

Honors
In August 2002, 11 official postage stamps were issued by the Republic of Benin in West Africa with von Lind's art.

Personal
von Lind's brother was killed on a mission over Germany in 1945 while serving in Italy with the 15th Air Force.

Von Lind passed away in 2017.

References

1937 births
Living people
People from Duluth, Minnesota
20th-century American painters
American illustrators
Fantasy artists
Pin-up artists
Artists from Minnesota
21st-century American painters